Progradungula is a genus of Australian large-clawed spiders that was first described by Raymond Robert Forster & Michael R. Gray in 1979.  it contains only two species: P. carraiensis and P. otwayensis.

The name is derived from Latin pro ("before"), and the genus name Gradungula, referring to the ancient ancestry of the genus. It is the first discovered web-building cribellate spider in a "primitive" araneomorph spider family and helped establish the idea that all araneomorph spiders evolved from cribellate ancestors.

These spiders have an uncommon web-making technique and prey-capturing behavior. A small (approximately 25 by 6 mm), tilting, ladder-like platform of cribellate capturing silk is supported by an overhead structure of threads linked to the rock walls and consists of two parallel stabilizing silk lines.

References

Araneomorphae genera
Gradungulidae
Spiders of Australia
Taxa named by Raymond Robert Forster